A couplet is a pair of lines in verse.

Couplet may also refer to:

 Couplet (traffic), a pair of one-way streets which carry opposing directions of traffic
 "Couplet" (Angel), a 2002 episode of the television show Angel
 Philippe Couplet (1623–1693), Belgian Jesuit
 Heart arrhythmia, where a couplet refers to a pair of abnormal beats

See also
 Couplet (Chinese poetry), a pair of lines of poetry which adhere to certain rules